Hawkmoon is a science fantasy tabletop role-playing game designed by Kerie Campbell-Robson and published by Chaosium in 1986.

Description
Hawkmoon is a science fantasy game based on Michael Moorcock's The History of the Runestaff novels. It is linked to the Stormbringer game in the "Eternal Champion" series. The rules are a variation of the standard Chaosium skill-based system from Basic Role-Playing. The "Players Book" (52 pages) describes Europe in the "Tragic Millennium," an age in which a loathsome magico-technic empire gradually brings the world under its control. The book also covers character creation, skills, weapons, and combat. The "Science Book" (16 pages) covers the history of the Tragic Millennium, technological items, and mutations. The "Gamemaster Book" (48 pages) explains how to run the game and also includes monsters and NPCs, treasures, statistics for the main characters from the novels, sample character record sheets, and two introductory miniscenarios.

Publication history
Hawkmoon was designed by Kerie Campbell-Robson with a cover by Frank Brunner and was published in 1986 by Chaosium as a boxed set that included a 52-page book, a 48-page book, a 16-page book, a map, a pamphlet, and dice.

One adventure was published for this edition, The Shattered Isle.

The Hawkmoon game became popular in France, where it was translated into French for the first time in 1988, and a third French edition was published in 2009.

Reception
Peter Green reviewed Hawkmoon for White Dwarf #86 saying, "There are a few problems with it, but fans of Michael Moorcock will be more than pleased to defend the Kamarg, or to battle in Londra to overthrow the Dark Empire for all time, or at least until other 'alternate realities' affect the outcome."

Reviews
 White Wolf #8 (Dec./Jan., 1987)
 Casus Belli #36 (Feb 1987)
Jeux & Stratégie #54

References

Basic Role-Playing System
Chaosium games
Fantasy role-playing games
Michael Moorcock's Multiverse
Role-playing games based on novels
Role-playing games introduced in 1986
Science fantasy role-playing games